Langdon Elwyn Mitchell  (February 17, 1862 – October 21, 1935) was an American playwright popular on Broadway in the early twentieth century.  He was the son of a noted writer and neurologist, S. Weir Mitchell (inventor of the "rest cure"), and the grandson of writer and physician John Kearsley Mitchell.  Born in Philadelphia, he studied in Dresden and Paris, attended the Harvard and Columbia law schools, and was admitted to the New York bar in 1886. A member of the American Academy of Arts and Letters, he wrote plays under his own name and poetry under the pen name "John Philip Varley."

Along with Clyde Fitch, William Vaughn Moody, Percy MacKaye, Ned Sheldon and Rachel Crothers, Langdon Mitchell was regarded as one of the more serious American dramatists in an era (c. 1900-1910) not notable for weighty plays. He was considered a solid craftsman whose plays provided good parts for talented actors and actresses.

Mitchell enjoyed an especially productive relationship with one of the most prominent actresses of his time, Mrs. Minnie Maddern Fiske, who was one of the first actresses to play Nora in Ibsen's A Doll's House on the New York stage and was renowned for her Hedda Gabler.  Mrs. Fiske acted one of her most lauded roles, the conniving Becky Sharp, in 1899 in Mitchell's dramatization of Thackeray's Vanity Fair, and she starred seven years later in his most famous work, The New York Idea, a play which had been written for her.  (The New York Idea is the only play by Mitchell to have survived his era and is occasionally performed in regional theaters. It was revived off-Broadway in New York in 1977, in a production starring Blythe Danner, and again in 2011, in an adaptation by David Auburn, the author of Proof.)

Theater critic and historian Brooks Atkinson wrote in 1970 of The New York Idea, a tart comedy about divorce, that "the dialogue is still lively and the idiocies of the character are still pertinent," securely placing it in the long tradition of drawing-room comedy.  Some reviewers at the time sanctimoniously took issue with the idea of a comedy about a socially questionable topic such as divorce, but others praised Mitchell for writing in the spirit of British playwrights Arthur Wing Pinero and Henry Arthur Jones.

Mitchell taught playwriting at the University of Pennsylvania from 1928 to 1930.

Major Plays
 In the Season (1893)  
 Becky Sharp (1899): a dramatization of Thackeray's Vanity Fair  
 A Kentucky Belle  
 Step by Step    
 The New York Idea (1907)  
 The Kreutzer Sonata (1907), adapted from the Yiddish of Jacob Gordin.
 The New Marriage (1911)

Other Writings
 Sylvian and Other Poems (1884)  
 Poems (1894)  
 Love in the Backwoods (1896) 
 Understanding America (1927)

References

Sources
Atkinson, Brooks.  Broadway. New York: Atheneum, 1970.

Attribution

External links
Langdon Mitchell Papers Billy Rose Theatre Division, New York Public Library for the Performing Arts
Langdon Ellwyn Mitchell Papers Manuscripts and Archives Division, New York Public Library 
 
 
 

1862 births
1935 deaths
Writers from Philadelphia
Harvard Law School alumni
Columbia Law School alumni
American dramatists and playwrights
University of Pennsylvania faculty